Claude Marion Hipps (April 23, 1927  May 20, 2017) was an American football defensive back who played two seasons with the Pittsburgh Steelers of the National Football League (NFL). He was drafted by the Steelers in the seventh round of the 1952 NFL Draft. He played college football at the University of Georgia and attended Waycross High School in Waycross, Georgia. He died in 2017 at the age of 90.

References

External links
Just Sports Stats

1927 births
2017 deaths
Players of American football from Georgia (U.S. state)
American football defensive backs
Georgia Bulldogs football players
Pittsburgh Steelers players
People from Hazlehurst, Georgia
People from Waycross, Georgia